On the Rocks is a 2020 American comedy-drama film written and directed by Sofia Coppola. It follows a father and daughter (Bill Murray and Rashida Jones) as they harbor suspicions about her husband's (Marlon Wayans) fidelity. It had its world premiere at the New York Film Festival on September 22, 2020. It received a limited theatrical release on October 2, 2020, by A24, followed by digital streaming on October 23, 2020, by Apple TV+. It received positive reviews from critics, who noted it as lighter than Coppola's previous films, and praised Murray’s performance. The film was released on Blu-ray and DVD on October 26, 2021, by Lionsgate Home Entertainment.

Plot
Laura and Dean are a married couple living in Manhattan with two young daughters, Maya and Theo. Laura is a novelist who appears to be stuck in a rut as she struggles to finish her latest book. Meanwhile, Dean is a successful entrepreneur at a burgeoning tech start-up, surrounded by young and attractive co-workers, often leaving Laura in charge of their daughters. One night, after arriving home from one of his frequent business trips, Dean climbs into bed and begins to kiss Laura passionately. However, once he recognizes her voice, he abruptly stops and goes to sleep, much to Laura's confusion. The next day, Laura finds a woman's toiletry bag in Dean's luggage; he later explains that it belongs to his business associate, Fiona, and he offered to carry it in his suitcase because she could not fit it in her carry-on.

Laura decides to confide her misgivings about Dean to her father, Felix, a wealthy, semiretired art dealer. A longtime playboy, Felix flirts with most women he encounters and believes that men are biologically wired to cheat. Convinced that Dean is having an affair, Felix proposes an investigation into him and encourages Laura to check his phone for incriminating text messages. Laura reluctantly does so, but finds nothing out of the ordinary.

While away on a business trip, Dean FaceTimes Laura on her birthday and surprises her with a gift, a Thermomix, about which she does not seem particularly excited. Despite previously insisting that she did not want to celebrate her birthday, Laura agrees to go out to a restaurant with Felix. He reveals that he had Dean followed and he was spotted shopping for jewelry at Cartier. As Laura grows suspicious, Felix picks her up in his vintage sports car and convinces her to stake out Dean as he attends a work dinner. After Dean leaves in a cab with Fiona, Felix speeds through the streets after them, but Laura and he end up pulled over by two police officers due to reckless driving. Felix knows the father of one of the officers, using this to charm his way out of a ticket.

Felix later discovers that Dean is planning a trip to a Mexican resort, which Laura does not believe. The next day, Dean casually tells her about the trip. Upon learning that Fiona is going on the trip, as well, an increasingly suspicious Laura calls Felix, who convinces her to follow Dean to Mexico to spy on him. At the resort, Laura and Felix eventually spot a woman in Dean's room one evening. When Laura rushes in to confront Dean, she is surprised to find Fiona in the room with another woman. Meanwhile, Dean calls Laura to inform her that he left early and is on his way back home. Realizing her mistake, Laura lashes out at Felix, accusing him of being selfish and berating him for his poor treatment of her mother, on whom he cheated many years earlier.

Back in New York, Laura and Dean have a heart-to-heart conversation, in which they share their respective fears and insecurities; she had been feeling alienated from him due to his constant business trips, while he said he had been busy working because he wanted to be a better provider for his family. They reconcile, and Laura overcomes her writer's block. Sometime later, Felix visits Laura and the two make amends. While at a restaurant, Dean surprises Laura with a second birthday gift—an engraved Cartier watch. Laura takes off the vintage watch Felix had previously given her and puts on Dean's.

Cast
 Rashida Jones as Laura Keane
 Bill Murray as Felix Keane
 Marlon Wayans as Dean
 Jessica Henwick as Fiona Saunders
 Jenny Slate as Vanessa
 Liyanna Muscat as Maya
 Alexandra and Anna Reimer as Theo
 Barbara Bain as Gran Keane
 Juliana Canfield as Amanda Keane
 Alva Chinn as Diane

Production
On November 15, 2018, it was announced that Apple had entered into a multi-year agreement with entertainment company A24 to produce a slate of original films in partnership with their worldwide video unit. On January 15, 2019, it was announced that the first film produced under that partnership would be directed by Sofia Coppola and titled On the Rocks.

Alongside the film's initial announcement, it was confirmed that it would star Bill Murray and Rashida Jones. In April 2019, Marlon Wayans joined the cast of the film. In June 2019, Jessica Henwick joined the cast of the film. By July, Jenny Slate had been announced as joining the cast.

Principal photography for the film began in June 2019 in New York City.

Release
On the Rocks had its world premiere at the New York Film Festival on September 22, 2020. It was released in a limited theatrical release on October 2, 2020, by A24, followed by digital streaming on October 23, 2020, by Apple TV+.

Reception 
The website's critics consensus reads: "On the Rocks isn't as potent as its top-shelf ingredients might suggest, but the end result still goes down easy – and offers high proof of Bill Murray's finely aged charm." On Metacritic, the film has a weighted average score of 73 out of 100 based on 47 critics, indicating "generally favorable reviews".

David Ehrlich of IndieWire gave the film a "B+" and said that "On the Rocks isn't destined to achieve the same kind of iconic status as some of Coppola's previous work. It isn't disposable, but it also doesn't offer anything to obsess about, which is a real change of pace for a filmmaker who launched a zillion Tumblrs and Pinterest boards and gave humanity the gif of Emma Watson saying 'I wanna rob.'" Owen Gleiberman of Variety said that "On the Rocks turns into a boozy humanistic hang-out caper movie, one that's light-spirited and compelling, mordantly alive to the ins and outs of marriage, and a winning showcase for Murray's aging-like-fine-whisky brand of world-weary deviltry." A. A. Dowd of The A.V. Club gave the film a B, praising Murray's performance as "an irresistible star turn, loose and funny and comfortable" but calling it weak among Coppola's work.

Other reviews were less glowing. Socialist magazine Jacobin Eileen Jones described the film as, "another meandering depiction of life as a bored and alienated celebrity," and noted it for being, "Extraordinarily vapid ... oblivious to its own world of wealth, privilege, and access."

Accolades

References

External links
 
 Script 

2020 films
2020 comedy-drama films
A24 (company) films
American comedy-drama films
American Zoetrope films
Apple TV+ original films
Films about father–daughter relationships
Films about writers
Films directed by Sofia Coppola
Films set in New York City
Films shot in New York City
Films with screenplays by Sofia Coppola
2020s English-language films
2020s American films